Sadık Emir Kabaca (born December 13, 2000) is a Turkish professional basketball player who plays as a power forward for Galatasaray Nef of the Basketbol Süper Ligi (BSL).

Professional career

Years in Bandırma (2016–2020) 
Sadık Emir Kabaca started his professional career at Bandırma Kırmızı in 2016–17 season and stayed with this club three seasons.

Beşiktaş (2020–2021)
On August 8, 2020, he has signed with Beşiktaş Icrypex of the Basketbol Süper Ligi (BSL).

Galatasaray (2021–present)
On August 23, 2021, he has signed with BSL club Galatasaray Nef.

References

External links
Sadık Emir Kabaca Champions League Profile
Sadık Emir Kabaca TBLStat.net Profile
Sadık Emir Kabaca Eurobasket Profile
Sadık Emir Kabaca TBL Profile

Living people
2000 births
Bandırma B.İ.K. players
Bandırma Kırmızı B.K. players
Beşiktaş men's basketball players
Galatasaray S.K. (men's basketball) players
Power forwards (basketball)
Sportspeople from İzmir
Turkish men's basketball players